The Djebel Chenoua-class corvettes are ships of Algerian design and assembly, developed in the shipyards of Mers el-Kebir near Oran and built in the 1980s. The 4 units are specialized in anti-ship warfare and search and rescue operations.

Design 

All four ships are now equipped with four C-802 missiles made in China.  The missile was derived from the French Exocet, has a 120 km range and an automatic guidance system.  The ships are armed with a Russian AK-176 76 mm main gun with a high rate of fire installed at the bow and a Gatling-type AK-630 30 mm air defense gun installed aft.

Ships

References 

Corvette classes
Corvettes of the Algerian National Navy